Jonathan David Edwards,  (born 10 May 1966) is a British former triple jumper. He is an Olympic, double World, European, European indoor and Commonwealth champion, and has held the world record in the event since 1995. At his record-breaking peak, Edwards was widely regarded as the greatest male triple-jumper in history, although his championship medal record, while impressive, was eclipsed by a handful of his competitors such as Christian Olsson and Christian Taylor.

Following his retirement as an athlete, Edwards has worked as a sports (primarily athletics) commentator and presenter for BBC television, before moving to Eurosport. Formerly a noted and devout Christian, he also presented episodes of the BBC Christian worship programme Songs of Praise, but ended his association with the program when he renounced his faith in 2007. In 2011 he was elected President of the Wenlock Olympian Society following the death of its then President, Roy Rogers.  He was a member of the London Organising Committee of the Olympic and Paralympic Games for the 2012 games.

Education 

Edwards was born in Westminster, London and attended West Buckland School in Devon where his potential for the triple jump was spotted at an early age. He was a strong all-rounder, and on leaving received the school's top award for sporting and academic excellence, the Fortescue Medal.

Contemporaries with Edwards at West Buckland School included Victor Ubogu and Steve Ojomoh, both former Bath and England Rugby international players. Edwards now has a Sports Hall at West Buckland named after him, The Jonathan Edwards Sports Centre. Edwards then studied Physics at Durham University, attending Van Mildert College.

Athletics career 

Due to his strong Christian beliefs during his athletic career, discussed in more detail below, he initially refused to compete on Sundays, but eventually decided to do so in 1993. This decision proved timely, since the qualifying round at that year's World Championships took place on a Sunday. He went on to win the bronze medal.

In his breakthrough year of 1995, Edwards produced a jump of 18.43 m (60 feet  inches) at the European Cup. The leap was wind assisted and did not count for record purposes, but it was a sign of things to come as he capped an unbeaten year with a historic gold medal performance at the World Championships, in which he broke the world record twice in the same meeting. On his first jump, he became the first man to legally pass the 18-metre barrier with a jump of 18.16 m (59 feet 7 inches). That record lasted for about 20 minutes. His second jump of 18.29 m made him the first to jump 60 feet. During his commentary for the 2008 Summer Olympics, Edwards observed that during the 1995 World Championships, he felt as if "he could jump as far as he needed to".  Later that same year, Edwards became the BBC Sports Personality of the Year.

During 1996 Edwards went into the 1996 Summer Olympics as favourite and world record holder, but it was American Kenny Harrison who took the gold with a jump of 18.09 m. Edwards walked away with the silver after a leap of 17.88 m (the longest ever jump not to win gold). Edwards won the gold medal at the 2000 Summer Olympics, and was appointed a CBE shortly thereafter. He also won golds at the 2001 World Championships and 2002 Commonwealth Games.

At one point in 2002, Edwards held all the gold medals for the "four majors" (Olympic Games, World Championships, Commonwealth Games and European Championships). He retired after the 2003 World Championships.

Post-athletics career 

Following his retirement, Edwards has pursued a media career as a television presenter mainly working for the BBC as a sports commentator and presenter, and on programmes such as Songs of Praise until he gave up this programme, due to his loss of faith, in February 2007.

Edwards regularly presents BBC coverage of athletics. When he is not presenting coverage, Edwards often provides expert analysis on field events as part of the BBC commentary team.

Edwards also received an Honorary Doctorate from Heriot-Watt University in 2002.

After retiring from competition, Edwards became a keen recreational cyclist and has presented the BBC's coverage of cycle racing since 2012. He also covered the 2014 Winter Olympics for the BBC and the 2014 Winter Paralympics for Channel 4.

Edwards also served as a presenter for the Olympic Announcement ceremonies during the IOC sessions in Guatemala in 2007 and Copenhagen in 2009.

In 2004, Edwards joined with Paula Radcliffe on an Olympic Special Who Wants to Be a Millionaire?. The pair raised £64,000 for charity with half of that sum going to the British Olympic Association and a quarter of the sum going to Asthma UK.

In 2011, Edwards became President of Wenlock Olympian Society, organisers of the annual Wenlock Olympian Games held in Shropshire.

He was a member of the London Organising Committee of the Olympic and Paralympic Games, representing athletes in the organisation of the 2012 Summer Olympics.

In February 2016, after 13 years with the BBC, Edwards announced that he had agreed to join Eurosport on an exclusive contract as the channel's lead presenter from 2017, although he would continue working for the BBC and Channel 4 on their coverage of the 2016 Summer Olympics and Paralympics alongside duties with Eurosport until the end of 2016, with his first anchoring role for the pay TV channel being the 2016 European Aquatics Championships in May in London.

International competitions

Personal bests 
Triple Jump – 18.29 m (WR), 18.43 m ( +2.4 m) (not ratified due to excessive wind conditions)
100 m – 10.48 s
Long jump – 7.41 m

Awards 
An honorary doctorate was conferred upon him at a ceremony at the University of Exeter on 21 January 2006.

Later in the same year, an honorary doctorate of the university (DUniv) was conferred upon him at the winter graduation ceremony of the University of Ulster (19 December 2006).

Edwards also received an Honorary Doctorate from Heriot-Watt University in 2002.

Personal life 
Edwards lives with his wife Alison in Newcastle upon Tyne. They have two sons, Nathan and Sam.

Edwards was one of 200 public figures who were signatories to a letter to The Guardian opposing Scottish independence in the run-up to the 2014 referendum on that issue.

Religious beliefs 
Edwards initially refused to compete on Sundays due to his devout Christian beliefs, a decision that cost him a chance to compete in the 1991 World Championships. However, in 1993, after much deliberation and discussion with his father (a vicar), he changed his mind, deciding that God gave him his talent in order for him to compete in athletics. He once said "My relationship with Jesus and God is fundamental to everything I do. I have made a commitment and dedication in that relationship to serve God in every area of my life." He presented episodes of the Christian television show Songs of Praise until 2007.

However, in June 2007, in an interview in The Times, Edwards said:

Furthermore, in the same interview with The Times he also stated "When you think about it rationally, it does seem incredibly improbable that there is a God." In the same interview he also said "I feel internally happier than at any time of my life."

In an interview for a film by Matthew Syed broadcast on BBC One at around 18:30 on the evening of 12 August 2012, after the last medal of the London 2012 Summer Olympics was awarded, Jonathan Edwards stated "It may seem odd to quote from the Bible since I have lost my faith, but...".

An interview reported by Jane Oddy in Mirror News (27 February 2014) quoted him saying "I am happy and actually it's fine. I don't miss my faith. In many ways I feel more settled and happier in myself without it. I don't know if that is related to losing my faith or would have been the case anyway, but it's a non-issue as far as I am concerned. Seven years on I don't feel a gap in my life and I suppose that's the proof of the pudding isn't it? Had I suddenly thought that life doesn't quite feel right, maybe I'd re-examine that – re-examine my faith. In fact, more than ever, I feel comfortable with where I am in life."

References

External links 

 
 
 
 
 
 http://www.mtc-uk.com/talent/jonathan-edwards/
 http://www.heraldsun.com.au/sport/athletics/sydney-medallist-emabrrassed-by-god-fervour/story-e6frfgkx-1225815303222
 Jonathan Edwards, Interview on London's 2012 Olympic Games

1966 births
Living people
People from Gosforth
Sportspeople from Tyne and Wear
Athletes from London
People from Westminster
English sports broadcasters
English television presenters
English male non-fiction writers
British male triple jumpers
English male triple jumpers
Olympic male triple jumpers
Olympic athletes of Great Britain
Olympic gold medallists for Great Britain
Olympic silver medallists for Great Britain
Olympic gold medalists in athletics (track and field)
Olympic silver medalists in athletics (track and field)
Athletes (track and field) at the 1988 Summer Olympics
Athletes (track and field) at the 1992 Summer Olympics
Athletes (track and field) at the 1996 Summer Olympics
Athletes (track and field) at the 2000 Summer Olympics
Medalists at the 1996 Summer Olympics
Medalists at the 2000 Summer Olympics
English Olympic medallists
Commonwealth Games gold medallists for England
Commonwealth Games silver medallists for England
Commonwealth Games gold medallists in athletics
Athletes (track and field) at the 1990 Commonwealth Games
Athletes (track and field) at the 1994 Commonwealth Games
Athletes (track and field) at the 2002 Commonwealth Games
World Athletics Championships athletes for Great Britain
World Athletics Championships winners
World Athletics Championships medalists
European Athletics Championships medalists
Goodwill Games medalists in athletics
Competitors at the 1998 Goodwill Games
Competitors at the 2001 Goodwill Games
AAA Championships winners
World Athletics record holders
World record holders in masters athletics
European Athlete of the Year winners
BBC Sports Personality of the Year winners
Commanders of the Order of the British Empire
Former Christians
English agnostics
English atheists
People educated at West Buckland School
Alumni of Van Mildert College, Durham
Commonwealth Games competitors for England
Goodwill Games gold medalists in athletics
Medallists at the 1990 Commonwealth Games
Medallists at the 1994 Commonwealth Games
Medallists at the 2002 Commonwealth Games